KGRR (97.3 FM) is a radio station broadcasting an active rock format to the Dubuque, Iowa, United States, area.  The station is licensed to Radio Dubuque, Inc.  Its transmitter is located alongside U.S. Highway 20 between Dubuque and Peosta on top of the U.S. 20 Bluff.
KGRR was used as the radio station call letters in an episode of 'The Twilight Zone' Nightsong (TV episode 1986 #2.6). The frequency on the show was 93.3 FM and it was located somewhere in California.

On March 1, 2010, KGRR shifted from a classic rock format to a mainstream rock format as "97.3 The Rock".

On-air staff include Program Director and Morning Show host Johnny Rhodes, and Zach Dillon on afternoons. Toni Gonzales and Loudwire Nights is on every weeknight 7p-12mid.  Weekends deliver the Rock 30 Countdown with LA Lloyd, and Full Metal Jackie

References

External links

GRR
Mass media in Dubuque, Iowa
Dubuque County, Iowa
Mainstream rock radio stations in the United States
Radio stations established in 1994
1976 establishments in Iowa